Markhal (also Romanized as Markhāl) is a village in Molla Sara Rural District, in the Central District of Shaft County, Gilan Province, Iran. At the 2006 census, its population was 730, in 183 families.

References 

Populated places in Shaft County